Konstantin Vitalyevich Lyzhin (born 19 February 1974 in Chelyabinsk) is a former Russian football player.

Lyzhin made one appearance in the Russian Premier League with FC Uralmash Yekaterinburg.

References

1974 births
Sportspeople from Chelyabinsk
Living people
Russian footballers
FC Ural Yekaterinburg players
Russian Premier League players
FC Uralets Nizhny Tagil players

Association football defenders